is a railway station in Toyono in the city of Nagano, Japan, jointly operated by the East Japan Railway Company (JR East) and the third-sector railway operating company Shinano Railway.

Lines
The station is also served by the 37.3 km Shinano Railway Kita-Shinano Line, lying 10.8 kilometers from the starting point of the line at Nagano Station.

Station layout
The station has one side platform and one island platform serving three tracks, with an elevated station building built over the tracks. The station is staffed.

Platforms

History
The station opened on 1 May 1888. With the privatization of Japanese National Railways (JNR) on 1 April 1987, the station came under the control of East Japan Railway Company (JR East).

A new station building was completed in February 2007. From this date, Kita-Nagano Station was transferred to the ownership of the third-sector operating company Shinano Railway.

Passenger statistics
In fiscal 2016, the JR portion of the station was used by an average of 1,320 passengers daily (JR East data, boarding passengers only).

In fiscal 2016,  the Shinano Railway portion of station was used by an average of 1,021 passengers daily (boarding passengers only).

Surrounding area
Former Toyono Town Hall
Chikuma River

See also
 List of railway stations in Japan

References

External links

 Shinano Railway Toyono Station information 
JR East Toyono Station information 

Railway stations in Nagano (city)
Iiyama Line
Railway stations in Japan opened in 1888
Kita-Shinano Line